The Mount Sterling Commercial Historic District is a historic business district located in downtown Mount Sterling, Illinois. The district, located immediately south of the Brown County Courthouse, includes four entire city blocks and parts of four others; 38 buildings, of which 35 are contributing buildings, are in the district.

Nearly all of the buildings in the district are Italianate commercial buildings; the only exceptions are a Classical Revival bank building and the courthouse, which incorporates both Italianate and Classical Revival elements. Two government buildings are located in the district: the 1868 courthouse and the Mount Sterling public library, which is located in a former hardware store.

The district was added to the National Register of Historic Places on May 8, 1987.

References

Commercial buildings on the National Register of Historic Places in Illinois
Neoclassical architecture in Illinois
Italianate architecture in Illinois
Buildings and structures in Brown County, Illinois
Historic districts on the National Register of Historic Places in Illinois
National Register of Historic Places in Brown County, Illinois